Hasanabad-e Bala may refer to:
Hasanabad-e Bala, Fars
Hasanabad-e Bala, Isfahan
Hasanabad-e Bala, Kerman
Hasanabad-e Bala, Lorestan